Dimitri Mohamed (born 11 June 1989) is a French professional footballer who plays as a centre-back or midfielder.

Personal life
Mohamed was born in France, and is of Somali descent through his grandfather.

References

External links
Player Profile at SO Foot

1989 births
Living people
People from Bully-les-Mines
French people of Somali descent
Sportspeople from Pas-de-Calais
French footballers
Footballers from Hauts-de-France
Association football central defenders
Association football midfielders
Amiens SC players
Royal Excel Mouscron players
Ligue 2 players
Belgian Pro League players
French expatriate footballers
French expatriate sportspeople in Belgium
Expatriate footballers in Belgium